Motor Action Football Club was a Zimbabwean football club based in Harare. They played in the top division in Zimbabwean football. In early 2000, the idea of owning a Premier League side by the current owners became reality. Out of the ashes of defunct Blackpool FC, Motor Action was born.

Motor Action played most home matches in Mutare (Sakubva Stadium);

Achievements
Zimbabwean League Champions: 1
 2010

Zimbabwean Independence Trophy: 1
 2005

Performance in CAF competitions
CAF Champions League: 1 appearance
2011 – First Round

External links
Official Site

Football clubs in Zimbabwe
Sport in Harare
2000 establishments in Zimbabwe